Diego Bonilla may refer to:

Diego Bonilla (footballer, born 1980), Uruguayan football defender
Diego Bonilla (footballer, born 2002), Uruguayan football forward for Macarthur FC